The Vanwall Vandervell 680 is a sports prototype racing car designed and built by Vanwall Racing Team. It is designed to the Le Mans Hypercar regulations and will debut in the FIA World Endurance Championship at the season-opening 1000 Miles of Sebring.

History 
In June of 2019, Vanwall Racing Team, then known as ByKolles Racing, announced that they would commit to the new Le Mans Hypercar regulations in the FIA World Endurance Championship that would come into effect in the 2021 season. 

On 18 September 2020, the team officially unveiled renderings of their new hypercar, initially dubbed the PMC Project LMH. ByKolles Racing intended to debut the car during the 2021 season, however, the project was delayed for the 2022 season. The team later acquired the rights to use the Vanwall name and the car was rebranded as a Vanwall LMH. ByKolles Racing officially applied to race in the 2022 FIA World Endurance Championship, however, they were rejected by the FIA and ACO due to the car not completing the homologation process. 

In 2023, ByKolles Racing officially rebranded to become the Vanwall Racing Team, and the car's name was officially revealed as the Vanwall Vandervell 680, named after Vanwall founder Tony Vandervell. On 12 January 2023, the team was approved by the FIA and ACO to race in the 2023 FIA World Endurance Championship.

Road car 
Vanwall also intend to sell a road version of the hypercar, called the Vanwall Vandervell 1000.

Development 
The car was designed and developed entirely in-house at the Vanwall Racing Team base in Greding, Germany.

Complete World Endurance Championship results
(key) Races in bold indicates pole position. Races in italics indicates fastest lap.

* Season still in progress.

References 

Sports prototypes
Le Mans Hypercars
Cars introduced in 2022